The 1980 RAC Tricentol British Saloon Car Championship was the 23rd season of the championship. The engine capacity limit was raised to 3500cc this year. Win Percy won his first drivers title, driving a TWR prepared Mazda RX-7.

Calendar & winners
All races were held in the United Kingdom. Overall winners in bold.

Championship results

References

British Touring Car Championship seasons
Saloon